The A4 (Also known as the Riga Bypass) is a national road in Latvia and part of the Riga ring road, connecting Baltezers to Saulkalne.

The road is part of European route E67, European route E77 and Latvian TEN-T road network.

It has one lane in each direction spanning the entire length.

It was reported that around 2020 widening of the road to 2x2 lanes will commence. As result it would receive an expressway or motorway status, and the current 90 km/h speed limit would be raised. The Annual average daily traffic of the A4 in 2016 was 11,954 cars per day.

History 
Construction on the A4 started in 1964 and was completed in 1980.

In 2011/2012 part of the A4 was rebuilt,

Crossings

Major cities crossed
Ulbroka
Salaspils

Gallery

References

External links
Autoceļš A4 in Google Maps

A04